AirMed International, LLC, based in Birmingham, Alabama, is a fee for service air ambulance airline. The company was founded in 1987 as MEDjet International and renamed AirMed International in 2003. AirMed offers international service to all countries except for Iraq, North Korea, and Libya. The company formerly managed the fixed-wing component of Mayo MedAir, the air medical services for the Mayo Clinic, until Mayo dropped the contract and is now operating their own airplane. AirMed is also a contracted carrier for the U.S. Department of Defense. AirMed holds accreditation from the Commission on Accreditation of Medical Transport Systems (CAMTS) and the European Aero-medical Institute.

AirMed is a member of the Association of Air Medical Services (AAMS), and created an air ambulance industry website, weatherturndown.com, allowing medical transport programs to share current information regarding delays or cancellations due to weather or other hazards. More than 450 U.S. air ambulance programs use this free safety website, winner of the 2008 AAMS Excellence in Community Service Award.

AirMed sells a pre-paid air ambulance membership for individuals and families known as AirMed Traveler. Blue Cross and Blue Shield of Alabama includes air medical benefits through AirMed for its members. In 2011, AirMed International was named Official Air Ambulance of INDYCAR, the Izod IndyCar Series and Firestone Indy Lights. Also in 2011, AirMed became a finalist for the award, Air Ambulance Provider of the Year, presented by the International Travel Insurance Journal.

Hubs
AirMed has two hubs, with one serving as the main hub.
• Birmingham-Shuttlesworth International Airport, Birmingham, Alabama (Main Hub):
Base of international operations, and AirMed's two Hawker 800A aircraft.

•  San Antonio, Texas:  In March 2017, AirMed acquired Air Medical of San Antonio, Texas, gaining a strategic
geographic location to supplement domestic operations.  This base is served by three Mitubishi Diamond Jet 
aircraft, and two King Air 90's.

Fleet
1 - Hawker 800A 
2 - Hawker 800XP
2 - Beechjet 400

Medical Capabilities
The long-range Hawker jets are equipped with a liquid oxygen system (LOX), allowing for longer transport of ventilator-dependent patients without the need to replenish on-board oxygen supply. AirMed's Hawker aircraft have the capability of transporting two patients simultaneously.
The company's aeromedical crews perform neonatal, pediatric and adult transports, in addition to highly specialized ECMO transports.

References

Sources
Exclusive Resorts adds Mayo Clinic and AirMed International
Chicago surgeon helps Haiti victims, flown on AirMed jet
Globe and Mail, Travel Insurance and Air Ambulance memberships

External links
 

Air ambulance services in the United States
Airlines established in 1987
Airlines based in Alabama
Companies based in Birmingham, Alabama
Medical and health organizations based in Alabama